"I Just Came Home to Count the Memories" is a country music song written by Glenn Ray.

Three versions of the song have charted. The first, released in 1975 by Bobby Wright on ABC Records. Cal Smith's version from 1977, reached number 15 on the same chart. John Anderson had the highest-charting rendition, releasing his version in late 1981 and taking it to number 7 on the country charts in early 1982. The song was covered by Gillian Welch and David Rawlings on the 2022 John Anderson tribute album Something Borrowed, Something New.

Chart performance

Bobby Wright

Cal Smith

John Anderson

References

1975 songs
1975 singles
1977 singles
1982 singles
John Anderson (musician) songs
Bobby Wright songs
Cal Smith songs
ABC Records singles
MCA Records singles
Warner Records singles